KZAT-FM (95.5 FM) is a radio station broadcasting a Spanish adult contemporary music format. Licensed to Belle Plaine, Iowa, United States, the station is currently owned by Grupo Roble Inc.

References

External links

ZAT-FM
Benton County, Iowa